Dougal Robertson (1924–1991) was a Scottish author and sailor who with his family survived being adrift at sea after their schooner was holed by a pod of orcas in 1972.

Early life
Robertson was born in Edinburgh in 1924, the youngest of eight children. He joined the British Merchant Navy after attending Leith Nautical College. He left maritime life after the attack on the SS Sagaing at Trincomalee in 1942, during which his wife Jessie and his son Duncan were killed. Robertson remarried and began work as a dairy farmer.

Voyage
On 27 January 1971, Robertson departed from Falmouth, Cornwall, on board the Lucette, a  wooden schooner built in 1922 which the family had purchased in Malta with their life's savings. He was accompanied by his wife Lyn, daughter Anne, son Douglas, and twin sons Neil and Sandy. Over the next year and a half, they sailed across the Atlantic, stopping at various ports of call in the Caribbean. Anne retired from the voyage in the Bahamas.

During their transit of the Panama Canal, the family members took aboard an inexperienced crew member named Robin Williams, who accompanied them on the next stage of their voyage to the Galápagos Islands and beyond to the islands of the South Pacific.

On 15 June 1972, Lucette was holed by a pod of orcas and sank approximately 200 miles west of the Galapagos Islands. The group of six people on board escaped to an inflatable life raft and a solid-hull dinghy with little in the way of tools or provisions.

Using the dinghy as a towboat powered by a jury-rigged sail, the group made its way towards the doldrums, hoping to find rain there so they could collect drinking water. They did so successfully, while catching turtles, dorado, and flying fish to eat. The inflatable raft became unusable after 16 days, so the six people crowded into the three-metre (10') long dinghy with their supplies.  They then continued to use the wind and current to their advantage, moving to the northeast towards Central America.

By their 38th day as castaways, they had stored dried meat and fresh water in such quantities that they intended to begin rowing that night to speed their progress. However, they were sighted and picked up that day by the Japanese fishing trawler Tokamaru II on her way to the Panama Canal.  Robertson, who had been keeping a journal in case they were rescued, recounted the ordeal in the 1973 book Survive the Savage Sea, on which the 1991 film of the same name was based.

The story was revisited in his son Douglas' book The Last Voyage of the Lucette.

Death
Dougal later wrote Sea Survival: A Manual, and continued to sail until his death from cancer in 1991. The manual was used to help save the life of Steven Callahan, who was stranded for 76 days in the Atlantic Ocean in 1981.

See also
 Steven Callahan, survived 76 days adrift in the Atlantic Ocean.
 Maurice and Maralyn Bailey, survived 117 days adrift in the Pacific Ocean.
 Jesús Vidaña and two other Mexican fishermen who survived in the Pacific Ocean for approximately 9 months from October 2005 to August 2006.
 Rose-Noëlle, trimaran on which four people survived 119 days adrift in the South Pacific.
 Poon Lim, who survived for 133 days adrift in the Atlantic.
 Essex, a whaler holed by a whale out from the Galápagos Islands.
 José Salvador Alvarenga, who spent 438 days drifting in a small open top boat from Mexico to the Marshall Islands.

General
List of people who disappeared mysteriously at sea

References

External links

 The tale of 'Ednamair'
 What it’s like to survive a shipwreck. The Robertson family spent 38 days adrift with little fresh water or food supplies after their yacht was sunk by killer whales. Their tale of survival reveals the extremes the human body can endure. By William Park. 9 January 2020, bbc.

1924 births
1992 deaths
20th-century English male writers
Animal attack victims
Attacks in 1972
Castaways
English male non-fiction writers
English non-fiction writers
English sailors
Formerly missing people
Maritime incidents in 1972
Orcas
Cetacean attacks
Sailing books
Shipwrecks in the Pacific Ocean